Shirley Jean Abbott Tomkievicz (November 16, 1934, Hot Springs, Arkansas, U.S. – April 8, 2019, Portland, Oregon, U.S.) was a magazine editor, writer, journalist, and historian.

Biography
Shirley Abbott graduated in 1952 from high school in Hot Springs, Arkansas as class valedictorian and in 1956 with a bachelor's degree (cum laude) in English and French from Texas State College for Women (renamed in 1957 Texas Woman’s University). In 1956 she, as one of the winners of an essay contest, was one of twenty young women that Mademoiselle magazine's editors selected as paid guest editors in New York City for their College Issue. For a brief time from 1956 to 1957 she worked in New York City as an editorial assistant for Henry Holt and Company. She was for the academic year 1957–1958 a Fulbright Scholar at the University of Grenoble and for the academic year 1958–1959 a scholarship graduate student in the French department of Columbia University. She decided she did want to teach French and left graduate school.

In 1959 Abbott was hired in New York City by Horizon: A Magazine of the Arts, where she worked for over 15 years and was for several years the magazine's editor-in-chief.

For 25 years she worked as a journalist and editor for the UC Berkeley Wellness Letter, published by the UC Berkeley School of Public Health in collaboration with University Health Publishing in New York City.

On September 11, 2001, in her apartment about one mile (1.6 kilometer) from the World Trade Center, Shirley Abbott Tomkievicz was talking on her phone to a friend when the first plane struck. The World Trade Center's destruction played a significant role in The Future of Love, her first (and only) novel.

In September 1964 in Manhattan she married Alexander W. Tomkievicz (1926–2012), a commercial artist. From 1995 to 2012 she and her husband lived in semi-retirement in their house in Haydenville, Massachusetts (although they continued to own an apartment in New York City). When he died, she moved back to New York City.

In 2005 she received Arkansas's Porter Prize for her non-fiction. In 2008 she was elected to the Arkansas's Writers Hall of Fame.

In the last years of her life she bought a house in Portland, Oregon and moved there from New York City to be near the family of one of her daughters. Upon her death from cancer in 2019, she was survived by her two daughters and three grandchildren.

Books

References

External links
 

1934 births
2019 deaths
Writers from Arkansas
American non-fiction writers
American women memoirists
American women novelists
People from Hot Springs, Arkansas
Texas Woman's University alumni
20th-century American women writers
21st-century American women writers
American women editors